Keyur Bhushan  (1928-2018) was an Indian politician. He was elected to the Lok Sabha, the lower house of the Parliament of India from Raipur, in Madhya Pradesh, as a member of the Indian National Congress, in 1980 and 1984.

References

External links
  Official biographical sketch on the Parliament of India website

1928 births
2018 deaths
Indian National Congress politicians
Lok Sabha members from Madhya Pradesh
India MPs 1957–1962